Imidazol-4-one-5-propionic acid is an intermediate in the metabolism of histidine.  It is a colorless compound that is sensitive to light in air. The compound features an imidazolone ring.

Occurrence
It arises via the action of urocanase on urocanic acid.  Hydrolysis of the heterocycle to the glutamic acid derivative is catalyzed by imidazolonepropionate hydrolase.

Microbial production of imidazol-4-one-5-propionic acid in the human gut has been shown to affect insulin signaling, which is relevant to type II diabetes.

See also
 Formiminoglutamic acid
 Urocanate
 Urocanate hydratase

References

Carboxylic acids
Imidazolines
Lactams